Juergen Penker (born October 17, 1982) is an Austrian ice hockey goaltender who participated at the 2011 IIHF World Championship as a member of the Austria men's national ice hockey team.

External links

1982 births
Austrian ice hockey goaltenders
VEU Feldkirch players
Hvidovre Ligahockey players
EHC Black Wings Linz players
Living people
Lørenskog IK players
EHC Lustenau players
HK Nitra players
Rögle BK players
EC Red Bull Salzburg players
Vienna Capitals players
People from Bregenz
Sportspeople from Vorarlberg
Austrian expatriate sportspeople in Slovakia
Expatriate ice hockey players in Austria
Austrian expatriate ice hockey people
Austrian expatriate sportspeople in Sweden
Austrian expatriate sportspeople in Denmark
Austrian expatriate sportspeople in Norway
Austrian expatriate sportspeople in Switzerland
Expatriate ice hockey players in Sweden
Expatriate ice hockey players in Denmark
Expatriate ice hockey players in Norway
Expatriate ice hockey players in Switzerland